Belmont Veterans Memorial Pier is a pier in Belmont Heights, Long Beach, California.

Summary
Belmont Veterans Memorial Pier is a popular site for fishing and strolling located at 35 39th Place. Sport Fishing can be accessed at the end of the pier, as well as a snack stand and bait shop.

History
A rock formation named "Devil's Gate" once stood at the pier's location.

In 1908 the citizens of Belmont Heights asked the city to build a pier. The pier has been called the Grand Avenue Pier, the Belmont Heights Pier and Devil's Gate Pier in its history.

When the pier was renamed "Belmont Veterans Memorial Pier" in 2005 an inscription was added at the entrance: "The people of Long Beach dedicate this pier to the men and women of our nation's armed forces, as a tribute to their love of country and a memorial to their sacrifice."

The pier was seen in the TV show Dexter in Episode 1, of Season 6, "Those Kinds of Things." In the episode the police find a dead man full of snakes, supposedly on a Miami beach.

The pier will host sailing at the 2028 Summer Olympics.

Renovations
In 2012 the pier was set to receive $800,000 for new restrooms and $250,000 for curb and railings repairs. The nearby pedestrian path was also set to receive a $5 million facelift and expansion.

Fishing
The pier is open one hour before sunrise and closes at midnight daily. Lights, stations for fish cleaning, restrooms and a bait and tackle shop are available. Fish species reported to be caught off the pier include halibut, barracuda, shark, sand bass, croaker and perch.

Events
Pirate Invasion of Belmont Pier
Every summer people dress up as pirates for a free pirate festival at the pier. The event includes music, dance, live theatre, black powder presentations, a costume contest among other fun activities.  The 2011 event was July 2–3 and included a Pirate Encampment.

Fourth of July 
A 4th of July party is held on the pier annually. The event includes live music, barbecue food and a beer garden. Long Beach fireworks can be seen from the area, with reserved seats available for the show by purchasing tickets.

External links
 Belmont Veterans Memorial Pier Foursquare venue page

References 

Buildings and structures in Long Beach, California
Venues of the 2028 Summer Olympics
Olympic sailing venues
Piers in Los Angeles County, California